Bereket Desta Gebretsadik (Amharic: ደስታ በረከት; born 23 May 1990 in Sinkata) is an Ethiopian sprinter. At the 2012 Summer Olympics, he competed in the Men's 400 metres.

Competition record

References

External links
IAAF profile

Ethiopian male sprinters
Living people
Olympic athletes of Ethiopia
Athletes (track and field) at the 2012 Summer Olympics
1990 births

People from Tigray Region
Athletes (track and field) at the 2011 All-Africa Games
African Games competitors for Ethiopia